The Cham–Đại Việt War of 1471 or  Vietnamese invasion of Champa was a military expedition launched by Lê Thánh Tông of Đại Việt under the Lê dynasty and is widely regarded as the event that marked the downfall of Champa. In retaliation for Cham raids, Vietnamese forces attacked and sacked the kingdom's largest city-state, Vijaya, and defeated the Cham army, bringing the kingdom of Champa to an end.

Background
The Cham and the Vietnamese had a long history of conflict. In the course of their wars, peace often coincided with economic exhaustion, with the antagonists rebuilding their economies just to go to war again. 

When fighting resumed in 1471, the Champa kingdom found itself weakened and isolated. It had experienced numerous civil wars and, at one point, had five different rulers. Because of the Cham's earlier attack on Angkor, the Khmers ignored their request for assistance when Đại Việt invaded. After an expedition to Champa of 1446, Vietnamese efforts to hold the Cham king as a vassal quickly failed and relations between the two kingdoms deteriorated. 

From mid-15th century onward, Champa's power must have been factually waned. No Vijaya Champa inscription or document survives after the last, which was erected in 1456, but this may have been due to the destruction of the mandalas in 1471 by the Vietnamese. The incompletely-studied decline of Champa, as historian Michael Vickery has asserted, must be pieced together from Vietnamese and Chinese histories and competently restudied.

According to the Ming Shilu, the Dai Viet launched a preliminary incursion into Champa in 1461, which forced the king's younger brother Mo-he-pan-luo-yue (摩訶槃羅悅) to flee to the mountains. The ruling king was Pan-luo-cha-quan (槃羅茶全), Panlotchatsuen (in Jesuit Notice Historique Sur la Cochinchine) or Trà Toàn, who allegedly reigned from 1460 to 1471 until he was captured by the Dai Viet.

The Cham also requested that Ming China intervene and help bring the Vietnamese back in line by force and demarcate the border between Champa and Vietnam. China, however, only verbally rebuked the Vietnamese for their incursion, as the Ming Chinese sought to preserve trade and border security rather than continue expansion. The Vietnamese ignored the rebuke and proceeded with their plan to destroy their rival.

The new Emperor of Dai Viet, Lê Thánh Tông, was a Confucian student. One of his key goals in diplomacy was fostering a Sinocentric worldview among Southeast Asian states; he wanted to get rid of formal connection with other Southeast Asian kingdoms in a revolutionary effort to transform his kingdom from an 'eclectic Southeast Asian aristocratic model' to the bureaucratic one based on Ming China's institutions. His focus on relations with Champa was "to bring civilization (Sinitic-leaning) to whom he considers uncivilized". 

To achieve his plan of overthrowing Champa, Thánh Tông spent years preparing the military, stockpiling provisions, and escalating incidents and animosity toward the Cham. These efforts included mobilization of huge manpower forces and in particular, the gunpowder unit, significantly drawn from the Ming model. Special emphasis was placed on weapons, transportation, and communications. Finally, Thánh Tông amplified and exaggerated Cham raids in his reports to the Ming, choosing them as pretexts for war against Champa.

Campaign

According to Vietnamese sources, in 1470 a Cham army numbering 100,000 under King Maha Sajan arrived and besieged the Vietnamese garrison at Huế. The local commander sent appeals to Hanoi for help. Thánh Tông responded angrily to the attack. Within weeks, soldiers were mobilized, provisions were collected and transported south, and delegations hastened to inform the Ming court of what was planned. Three months later, during the winter season, Thánh Tông published the detailed campaign orders to his generals and proclaiming in a long edict the reasons for the expedition.

On November 28, 1470, a 100,000-strong Vietnamese naval expedition led by Thánh Tông himself set out from Hóa Châu to attack Champa, followed by another 150,000 civilian support personnel on December 8. The Phủ biên tạp lục states that the king reached Thuận Hóa citadel in early 1471, while the Toàn thư says he sailed straight to Champa. Fighting started on February 24, 1471, when five hundred Vietnamese warships and 30,000 troops were ordered to block the way of 5,000 Cham troops and elephants. Then one thousand warships and 70,000 troops followed under the leadership of Thánh Tông, trying to flank Cham positions. The fleet began embarking troops on land near Cửa Đại Chiêm (Đại Chiêm hải khẩu/Great Port of Champa) in Quang Nam and went engaging Cham defenders.

Meanwhile, another Vietnamese column quietly moved west of the mountains. After bitter fighting, the Cham withdrew their lines from the coast to inland, where they realized that they had been surrounded by invaders from three sides: from the north, from the western mountains, and from the sea. The Vietnamese continued to advance, using gunpowder superiority to curb war elephants, pushing the Cham army toward the capital of Vijaya (Cha Ban). Thị Nại citadel on the coast was captured on March 18, and 400 Cham were killed.

Siege of Vijaya
Thánh Tông then converged his armies to surround the city of Vijaya (12 miles west of Thị Nại), where the Champa king was seeking refugee inside. According to Vietnamese sources, the Cham king Trà Toàn apparently tried to compromise and make an agreement for his kingdom's surrender, but Thánh Tông ignored and pressed on the siege.

This came at a massive financial cost, since it drained the Vietnamese treasury of 1,000 gold liang a day. The Vietnamese forces used cannons to bombard the Cham capital, Vijaya, blasting a breach in the east of the city's walls prior to storming the city. On March 22, the city fell after a four-day siege. More than 30,000 Chams were captured, including Trà Toàn and his family members, who were deported to the north, and over 60,000 killed. Another 40,000 were executed.

The Malay Annals accounts for the fall of Champa mention that the king of Kuchi (Đại Việt) sent messengers to the Treasure Minister of Champa, deceiving him to defect and open the city gate. At dawn the men of Đại Việt entered the city and vanquished the Cham defenders with ease, Vak (Vijaya) fell and the king of Champa was slain. The 18th-century Jesuit history Notice Historique also described King Lyhao (Thánh Tông) triumphing Champa in 1471 and had King Panlotchatsuen (Trà Toàn) taken prisoner, noting that the Ming emperor refused to assist Champa due to probable Champa's support to Tonkin rebel Tching Ki Kouang (Trùng Quang) 50 years earlier.

Aftermath
The balance of power maintained between the Cham and the Vietnamese for more than 500 years came to an end with the destruction of the Champa kingdom. The Vietnamese enslaved several thousand Chams and forced Chams to assimilate into Vietnamese culture. The number included 50 members of the royal family. In 1509, Thánh Tông's grandson, Lê Uy Mục, carried out a massacre against remaining Cham royal members and slaves in the neighborhood of capital Hanoi. In autumn that year, the king also issued executions for all remaining Cham prisoners that had been captured in the 1471 war.

A Cham general, Bố Trì Trì, fled and established himself as the ruler of the rump state of Panduranga (modern Phan Rang), more than 250 kilometers to the south. That state lasted until 1832, when emperor Minh Mạng initiated the final conquest of the remnants of Champa. Trì Trì and two others, a ruler in the Central Highlands (the region of Kon Tum and Pleiku) and a ruler on the coast immediately to the south of Bình Định (in the modern provinces of Phú Yên and Khánh Hòa), subsequently submitted to Thánh Tông as vassals. In the conquered land, king Thánh Tông established Quảng Nam as Đại Việt's 13th province, with 42 military colonies (Đồn điền), setting up administration, customary, regulations,... according to Vietnamese Confucian apparatus.

Cham representatives told the Ming Empire that Annam destroyed their country. The Chinese Ming Dynasty records evidence the extent of the Vietnamese destruction wrought on Champa. The Chams informed the Ming that they continued to fight against the Vietnamese occupation of their land, which had been turned into the 13th province of Đại Việt. Cham resistance continued in the mountains and valleys in the south. The Ming annals recorded that in 1485 that "Champa is a distant and dangerous place, and Annam is still employing troops there."

The Vietnamese ceramics trade was severely affected due to the impact suffered by the Cham merchants after the invasion. The Ming scholar Wu Pu (吳樸) recommended that to help stop the Vietnamese, Ming should help resuscitate the Champa Kingdom. The Ming dynasty however did not follow his recommendation, due to internal security concerns.

A massive wave of Cham emigration radiated across Southeast Asia. In Cambodia, Cham refugees were welcomed, but the sources do not describe how they arrived in Cambodia and where they settled. In Thailand, there are records of Cham presence since the Ayudhaya period. In the Indonesian archipelago, the Sejarah Melayu (Malay Annals) relates that after the collapse of Vijaya in 1471, two Cham princes named Indera Berma Shah and Shah Palembang sought asylum in Melaka and Aceh. Shortly after his conversion to Islam, Indera Berma Shah was appointed minister at the court of Sultan Mansur Shah. The Sejarah Melayu also mentions Cham presence in Pahang and Kelantan, where the Kampung Laut Mosque is said to have been built by Champa sailors on their way to Java.

The Ming Empire sent a censor, Ch'en Chun, to Champa in 1474 to install the Champa King, but his entry was blocked by Vietnamese soldiers who had taken over Champa. He proceeded to Malacca instead and its ruler sent back tribute to the Ming dynasty. Malacca sent envoys again in 1481 to inform the Ming that, while going back to Malacca in 1469 from a trip to China, the Vietnamese attacked them, castrating the young and enslaving them. The Malaccans reported that Đại Việt was in control of Champa and sought to conquer Malacca, but the Malaccans did not fight back, due to a lack of permission from the Ming to engage in war. The Ming Emperor scolded them, ordering the Malaccans to strike back with violent force if the Vietnamese attacked.

More ethnic Vietnamese had moved south and settled on conquered Cham lands. Only the small Cham kingdom of Panduranga remained in the south. 

However, as Đại Việt's power declined during the sixteenth century, the rise of the Burmese Empire under Tabinshweti and Bayinnaung to become the major force in mainland Southeast Asia had put an end to Vietnamese expansion. Around 162,000 Cham remain in Vietnam today.

References

Sources 

 

  
 
 
 

 
 
 
 
 

History of Champa
15th century in Vietnam
Conflicts in 1471
Wars involving Champa
Wars involving the Đại Việt Kingdom
1470s in Asia
History of Bình Định province